Amurdak, also rendered Amurdag, Amurdak, Amurag, Amarag and Wureidbug, is an Aboriginal Australian language historically spoken in an area around the eastern coast of Van Diemen Gulf, in the Northern Territory of Australia. It is a recently extinct language, the last recorded fluent speaker left being in 2021.

Status
According to a report by the National Geographic Society and the Living Tongues Institute for Endangered Languages, it is an endangered language. The last living speaker, Charlie Mungulda, worked with Australian linguists Nick Evans, Robert Handelsmann and others, over several decades to record his language.

The Amurdak language and Charlie Mungulda were featured in Language Matters with Bob Holman, a 2015  PBS documentary about endangered languages.

According to the 2016 Australian census, there were no speakers of Amurdak in 2016; however,  Mungulda's death has not been reported, and he co-authored a paper published in May 2020.

Phonology

Consonants

 
Evans but not Mailhammer identifies a palatal lateral  in Amurdag.

Vowels
Mailhammer (2009) does not provide a vowel inventory but Evans (1998) briefly discusses vowels in his paper, noting that Iwaidjan languages including Amurdak have a three vowel (/a/, /i/, /u/) system.

References

Further reading
Evans, Nicholas (1998). "Iwaidja mutation and its origins". In Anna Siewierska & Jae Jung Song. Case, Typology and Grammar: In honor of Barry J. Blake. Amsterdam/Philadelphia: John Benjamins Publishing Company. pp. 115–149. 
Handelsmann, R. (1991). Towards a description of Amurdak: a language of northern Australia. Honours thesis, University of Melbourne, 
Mailhammer, R. (2009) 'Towards an Aspect-Based Analysis of the Verb Categories of Amurdak', Australian Journal of Linguistics, vol. 29, no. 3, pp. 349–391. 
Neidjie, B., Mulurinj, N., Mailhammer, R., & Handelsmann, R. (2009). Amurdak inyman: Six stories in Amurdak.

Iwaidjan languages
Endangered indigenous Australian languages in the Northern Territory
Languages extinct in the 2010s
Extinct languages of the Northern Territory